The 2014 Austria GP2 Series round was a GP2 Series motor race held on June 21 and 22, 2014 at the Red Bull Ring in Spielberg, Austria. It was the fourth round of the 2014 GP2 Series. The race weekend supported the 2014 Austrian Grand Prix.

Classification

Qualifying

Feature race

Sprint race

See also 
 2014 Austrian Grand Prix
 2014 Red Bull Ring GP3 Series round

External links
 

Red Bull Ring
GP2